AJ Agazarm (born July 26, 1990) is an American submission grappler, mixed martial artist and Brazilian Jiu Jitsu black belt practitioner.

A multiple-time champion in coloured belts, Agazarm is a black belt World No-Gi Champion, Pan American No-Gi Champion, Brazilian National No-Gi Champion, European No-Gi Open Champion as well as a ADCC Submission Fighting World medallist. In 2019 Agazarm started a professional MMA career after signing with Bellator.

Early life and education
Agazarm was born in Florida and is of Armenian descent.
He began wrestling as a sophomore in high school. He performed well enough in high school to win a wrestling scholarship to University of the Cumberlands in Williamsburg, Kentucky from 2005-2007. Agazarm then transferred to Ohio State, a highly ranked NCAA Division I wrestling program.

Grappling career
Agazarm was awarded his black belt in Brazilian jiu jitsu in 2013 by Eduardo de Lima and Carlos Gracie Jr. That same year Agazarm got third place at the Pan Jiu-Jitsu No-Gi Championship in the black belt open-weight division and first in the lightweight division. Later in 2013 at the World Nogi Brazilian Jiu-Jitsu Championship Agazarm placed third in the under 73.5 kg black belt division. In 2017, Agazarm won a silver medal at the ADCC Submission Wrestling World Championship in the under 66 kg weight class and another silver at the World Nogi Brazilian Jiu-Jitsu Championship in the lightweight division. From 2015-2018 Agazarm participated in six Polaris Pro Grappling events.

On November 6, 2021, Agazarm competed against Celsinho Vinicius at BJJ Stars 7, losing the match on points.

Agazarm then faced English grappler Jed Hue at Polaris 18 on November 27, 2021. He lost the match by decision.

In 2022, Agazarm received an invite to compete in the 66kg division of the 2022 ADCC World Championship. Agazarm lost to Jeremy Skinner on points in the opening round and was eliminated from the tournament.

Jiu-Jitsu accomplishments

2018
  IBJJF Pan Nogi (Black Belt 73.5 kg)
2017
  IBJJF European No-Gi (Black Belt 73.5 kg)
  IBJJF European No-Gi (Black Belt Absolute)
  ADCC 2017 World Championship (66 kg)
  IBJJF Nogi World Championships (Black Belt 73.5 kg)
  IBJJF Rome International Open (Black Belt Absolute)
2016
  IBJJF Nogi World Championships (Black Belt 73.5 kg)
2015
  IBJJF Pan American (Black Belt 76 kg)
2014
  IBJJF Nogi World Championships (Black Belt 73.5 kg)
  IBJJF European No-Gi (Black Belt 73.5 kg)
  IBJJF European No-Gi (Black Belt Absolute)
  IBJJF Pan Nogi (Black Belt Absolute)
  IBJJF Pan Nogi (Black Belt 73.5 kg)
  IBJJF European Open (Black Belt 76 kg)
2013
  IBJJF Pan Nogi (Black Belt 73.5 kg)
  CBJJ Brazilian Nogi Championship (Black Belt 73.5 kg)
  IBJJF European No-Gi (Black Belt 73.5 kg)
  CBJJ Brazilian Nogi Championship (Black Belt Absolute)
  IBJJF American National Championship (76 kg)
  IBJJF Pan Nogi (Black Belt Absolute)
  IBJJF European No-Gi (Black Belt Absolute)
  IBJJF Nogi World Championships (Black Belt 73.5 kg)
  CBJJ Brazilian Championship (Brown Belt Absolute)
  IBJJF European Open (Brown Belt 76 kg)
  CBJJ Brazilian Championship (Brown Belt 76 kg)

Mixed martial arts career
Prior to turning professional Agazarm compiled an 8–0 amateur mma record. Agazarm made his professional MMA debut in Bellator MMA at Bellator 214 on January 26, 2019 at The Forum in Inglewood, California. He lost to Jesse Roberts by split decision fighting at a catchweight of 160 lbs. After this, he went on to win his next three fights for Bellator against Jacob Landin at Bellator 224, Johnathan Quiroz at Bellator 228 and Adel Altamimi at Bellator 238.

He then lost his fifth professional fight against Cris Lencioni by unanimous decision at Bellator 243. Agazarm suffered a severe injury to his knee in the first round.

Bellator MMA announced on October 27, 2020, that Agazarm had been released from the promotion due to injury, but will revisit in future.

Mixed martial arts record

|-
| Loss
| align=center| 3–2
| Cris Lencioni
| Decision (unanimous)
| Bellator 243
| 
| align=center| 3
| align=center| 5:00
| Uncasville, Connecticut, United States
|
|-
| Win
| align=center| 3–1
| Adel Altamimi
| Submission (triangle choke)
| Bellator 238
| 
| align=center| 3
| align=center| 1:22
| Inglewood, California, United States
|
|-
| Win
| align=center| 2–1
| Jonathan Quiroz
| Decision (unanimous)
| Bellator 228
| 
| align=center| 3
| align=center| 5:00
| Inglewood, California, United States
|
|-
| Win
| align=center| 1–1
| Jacob Landin
| Submission (rear-naked choke)
| Bellator 224
| 
| align=center| 1
| align=center| 4:21
| Thackerville, Oklahoma, United States
|
|-
| Loss
| align=center| 0–1
| Jesse Roberts
| Decision (split)
| Bellator 214
| 
| align=center| 3
| align=center| 5:00
| Inglewood, California, United States
|
|}

Instructor lineage 
Mitsuyo Maeda > Carlos Gracie Sr. > Helio Gracie > Carlos Gracie Jr. (> Eduardo de Lima) > AJ Agazarm

Personal life 

Agazarm also teaches Brazilian jiu-jitsu and promoted his younger brother Anthony, who is also a competitor, to purple belt in March 2023.

See also
 List of male mixed martial artists

Notes

References

External links
 Aj Agazarm's Rokfin Channel
 
 
 AGAZARMY Fight Shorts

American practitioners of Brazilian jiu-jitsu
Living people
People awarded a black belt in Brazilian jiu-jitsu
American male mixed martial artists
1988 births
Armenian male mixed martial artists
Lightweight mixed martial artists
Mixed martial artists utilizing collegiate wrestling
Mixed martial artists utilizing Brazilian jiu-jitsu
Sportspeople from Hollywood, Florida
Mixed martial artists from Florida
American people of Armenian descent
Ohio State Buckeyes wrestlers
Cumberlands Patriots wrestlers
World No-Gi Brazilian Jiu-Jitsu Championship medalists
Brazilian jiu-jitsu practitioners who have competed in MMA (men)